London Streets is an arm of Transport for London (TfL) which is responsible for managing identified greatest through-routes in Greater London –  of roads. It was known as TfL Street Management for many years until the start of the 2007 fiscal year.

Extent of responsibility
The largest responsibility is for red routes.

London Streets is also responsible for managing the London congestion charge, a fee that is charged to most motorists entering the central London area, as well as street CCTV systems and control of traffic lights and bus lane enforcement cameras (BLECs).

In both domains London Streets leads on most byelaws and prosecution mechanisms and stance for offences that impact traffic and safety directly. In civil law it is among local authorities that should monitor costs, co-ordinate, recover costs and ensure reinstatement by contractors and statutory undertakers under the NRSWA 1991.

London Streets also acts as a London highways authority basic advisor and in particular issues and refers to its influential Streetscape Guidance, standards for roads and streets to make London's roads safer and more efficient.

Other highways
Motorways within London are the responsibility of National Highways. 

The rest of the streets are the responsibility of the London boroughs – or natural person or corporate owners predominantly in the case of the tiny percentage of roads that are private roads, and over which the law provides for shared responsibilities with users in the case of public rights of way.

Period of own logo

From 2007 London Streets used a blue and grey variant of the Transport for London roundel hosting the "Streets" name. This was withdrawn in 2014.

References

External links

London Roads website 
Map of the TfL Road Network (PDF)
New Roads and Street Act 1991

Streets
Roads in London
Transport for London